CHQX-FM is a Canadian radio station that broadcasts a classic hits format at 101.5 FM in Prince Albert, Saskatchewan. The station is branded on-air as 101.5 Beach Radio and is owned by Jim Pattison Group who also owns sister stations CFMM-FM and CKBI. CHQX's studios are located at 1316 Central Avenue.

The station received approval by the CRTC in 2000 and began broadcasting in June 2001.

On October 28, 2016, CHQX-FM rebranded to XFM 101.5 but kept the same format. In September 2020, the station changed its format to classic hits and rebranded to 101.5 Beach Radio.

Rebroadcasters

Current on air lineup
The Morning After Show with Lew Harrison

Lew is one of the longest serving radio hosts in Prince Albert and area. Lew brings his own quirky sense of humour and keen sense of observation to the radio.

Mid Days with Charlee Morgan

Charlee Morgan broadcasts 10am - 2pm. Join Charlee for 'That 80's Show' weekdays from 12-1pm.

Afternoons with Garth Kalin

Garth Kalin broadcasts from 2 – 6pm.

References

External links
101.5 Beach Radio

Hqx
Hqx
Hqx
Radio stations established in 2001
2001 establishments in Saskatchewan